Johannes Toom (26 July 1896 – 26 April 1972) was an Estonian weightlifter.

He was born in Parasmäe, Harju County.

He won silver medal at 1922 World Weightlifting Championships.

He is buried at Jõelähtme cemetery.

References

1896 births
1972 deaths
Estonian male weightlifters
People from Jõelähtme Parish